Friedrich Leopold Graf zu Stolberg-Stolberg (7 November 1750 – 5 December 1819), was a German lawyer, and translator born at Bramstedt in Holstein (then a part of Denmark). He was also a poet of the Sturm und Drang and early Romantic periods.

Life
Friedrich Leopold belonged to a cadet branch of the Stolberg family. He was born the son of a Danish magistrate and owner of a manorial estate, Count Christian zu Stolberg. A few years after his birth the family moved to Copenhagen and soon formed friendships with distinguished literary men, especially Friedrich Gottlieb Klopstock. Together with his elder brother Christian, Friedrich Leopold went to the University of Halle in 1770, in order to study German Law. His other studies embraced the Classics and various historical courses. The two brothers then studied in Göttingen and were a prominent members of the Göttinger Hainbund, a literary society of young men who had high aspirations for the unity of the country, and who cultivated German poetry. After leaving the university, in 1775 the brothers made a journey to Switzerland in company with the famed poet Johann Wolfgang von Goethe.

In 1777 Friedrich Leopold was appointed envoy of the prince bishop of Lübeck at the Court of Copenhagen, but often stayed at Eutin to spend time with his college friend and member of the Dichterbund, Johann Heinrich Voss. In 1781, he was chief administrator at Eutin.

In 1782 Stolberg married Agnes von Witzleben, whom he celebrated in his poems. After six years of happy married life, leaving two sons and two daughters (one of them, Marie Agnes, married Ferdinand, son of Christian Frederick of Stolberg-Wernigerode), Agnes died an early death in 1788. 

Friedrich Leopold then became Danish envoy to the Court of Prussia, and contracted a second marriage with the Countess Sophie von Redern in 1789. After their wedding he and his wife took a grand tour through Germany, Switzerland, and Italy; he documented this trip in a series of letters, Travels through Germany, Switzerland, Italy and Sicily.

This tour was of great importance for his religious development, as he then made the acquaintance of the devout Catholic Freiherr von Droste-Vischering, as well as of Droste-Vischering's resident tutor, the distinguished theologian Katerkamp. In 1791 he was appointed president of the Lübeck episcopal court at Eutin. In June, 1800, he joined the Catholic Church in the private chapel of the Princess Gallitzin at Osnabrück, and on 22 August he resigned his various positions, retiring to Münster in Westphalia. He was active in a group of Westphalian Catholics working to develop Romanticism.

By his second marriage Stolberg had a large family, of which all, with the exception of the oldest daughter, followed their father's example and joined the Catholic Church in 1801. The oldest daughter, Agnes, was betrothed to the Lutheran Count Ferdinand of Stolberg-Wernigerode. Four sons and two sons-in-law took part in the campaign against France in 1814; one of these sons was killed at the Battle of Ligny (1815).

For his conversion to Catholicism, Friedrich Leopold was severely attacked by his former friend Voss (Wie ward Fritz Stolberg zum Unfreien?, 1819). After living for a while (from 1812) in the neighbourhood of Bielefeld, he removed to his estate of Schloss Sondermühlen (now part of Melle) near Osnabrück, where he remained until his death in 1819.

Works
In his student days, Stolberg was a member of the Göttinger Hainbund, part of the Sturm und Drang movement. "Friedrich’s verse also has a pastoral, idyllic quality that ties his work to the Romantics."

Friedrich Leopold wrote many odes, ballads, satires and dramas; among them the tragedy Timoleon (1784).  He produced translations of the Iliad (1778), of Plato (1796-1797), Aeschylus (1802), and Ossian (1806); he published in 1815 a Leben Alfreds des Grossen, and a voluminous Geschichte der Religion Jesu Christi (17 vols., 1806–1818). Other works include poetry, as Ballads (1779) and Iambics (1784), and other works, such as Plays (1787) and Travels (1791); and novels, such as The Island (1788). He also wrote a history of Alfred the Great (1816); a life of St. Vincent de Paul; translated passages from the works of St. Augustine, and also wrote meditations on the Holy Scriptures, which, however, together with the Büchlein der Liebe, and the polemical pamphlet Kurze Abfertigung des langen Schmähschrifts des Hofrats Voss, did not appear until after his death.

Several of his poems were set to music by the Austrian composer Franz Schubert.

Bibliography
The Collected Works of Christian and Friedrich Leopold zu Stolberg were published in twenty volumes in 1820–1825; 2nd ed. 1827. Friedrich's correspondence with FH Jacobi will be found in Jacobi's Briefwechsel (1825-1827); that with Voss was edited by Otto Hellinghaus (1891).

Selections from the poetry of the two brothers will be found in August Sauer's Der Göttinger Dichterbund, iii. (Kürschner's Deutsche Nationalliteratur, vol. 50, 1896). See also:
Theodor Menge, Der Graf F. L. Stolberg and seine Zeitgenossen (2 vols, 1862)
JH Hennes, Aus F. L. von Stolbergs Jugendjahren (1876)
the same, Stolberg in den zwei letzten Jahrzehnten seines Lebens (1875)
Johannes Janssen, F. L. Graf zu Stolberg (2 vols, 1877), 2nd ed. 1882
Wilhelm Keiper, F. L. Stolbergs Jugendpoesie (1893).

Notes

References

Further reading
  v.2 + Index

External links
 Zeno.org Biography and Works Online (In German)

1750 births
1819 deaths
People from Bad Bramstedt
People from the Duchy of Holstein
German Catholic poets
Translators to German
Converts to Roman Catholicism from Lutheranism
Danish nobility
University of Göttingen alumni
Friedrich Leopold
German male poets
18th-century German poets
19th-century German poets
18th-century German male writers
19th-century German male writers
Friedrich Leopold
German male non-fiction writers
18th-century German translators
19th-century German translators